Andrei Chiliman (born 18 July 1947) is a Romanian sailor. He competed in the Tornado event at the 1980 Summer Olympics.

References

External links
 

1947 births
Living people
Romanian male sailors (sport)
Olympic sailors of Romania
Sailors at the 1980 Summer Olympics – Tornado
Place of birth missing (living people)